A simple point process is a special type of point process in probability theory. In simple point processes, every point is assigned the weight one.

Definition 
Let  be a locally compact second countable Hausdorff space and let  be its Borel -algebra.

for an index set  and random elements  which are almost everywhere pairwise distinct. Here  denotes the Dirac measure on the point .

Examples 
Simple point processes include many important classes of point processes such as Poisson processes, Cox processes and binomial processes.

Uniqueness 
If  is a generating ring of  then a simple point process  is uniquely determined by its values on the sets . This means that two simple point processes  and  have the same distributions iff

Literature 

Point processes